Patiriella brevispina, or more correctly Meridiastra gunnii (O'Loughlin & Waters 2004), also known as  purple seastar, is an Australian species of sea star. It has six arms and is of purple colour with orange feet.

External links
http://www.environment.gov.au/cgi-bin/species-bank/sbank-treatment.pl?id=78803

Patiriella
Fauna of Western Australia
Animals described in 1938